"I Will Love Again" is a song by Canadian-Belgian singer Lara Fabian. It was released as the second single of her self-titled album in 2000 and was her first English single. The song was written by Mark Taylor and Paul Barry and was produced by Taylor and Brian Rawling.

"I Will Love Again" reached number five in Belgium's Wallonia region and number eight in New Zealand. The song also reached number one on the US Billboard Hot Dance Club Play chart and number 32 on the Billboard Hot 100. Elsewhere, the single reached the top 20 in Austria, Canada, France, Hungary, Iceland, Spain, and Switzerland.

Versions
There are four versions of the song. The English versions are the dance-pop ballad and the ballad reprise. The Spanish versions are "Otro Amor Vendrá" and "Otro Amor Vendrá (ballad reprise)". All these version are available on the album's deluxe edition.

Reception
The song received a positive reception from most music critics. William Ruhlmann picked the track as the "Album's best track" in his AllMusic review. The Dooyoo review was extremely positive, and it said: "This is the strongest track on the album - a real pop song with great uptempo beat. Written by Paul Barry and Mark Taylor, and co-produced by Brian Rawling, its easily the most modern song on the album, and should have been a huge hit with the correct promotion. It actually was a huge hit in some parts of the world, including Spain and performed well in the US too. Fabian sings optimistically about getting over a broken heart and finding a new love. 10/10".

Music video
Two music videos were made for the song. One features the singer in a house party and the other features Lara in a club party.

Track listings

US maxi-CD single 
 "I Will Love Again" (album version) – 3:47
 "I Will Love Again" (David Morales club mix) – 8:00
 "I Will Love Again" (Hex Hector main mix) – 11:00
 "I Will Love Again" (Thunderpuss club mix) – 10:34

US 12-inch single 
A1. "I Will Love Again" (David Morales club mix) – 8:02
A2. "I Will Love Again" (Thunderpuss club mix) – 10:34
B1. "I Will Love Again" (David Morales club mix) – 7:12
B2. "I Will Love Again" (Hex Hector main mix) – 11:03

UK CD single 
 "I Will Love Again" – 3:43
 "I Will Love Again" (David Morales radio remix) – 3:52
 "I Will Love Again" (ballad reprise) – 4:54
 "I Will Love Again" (video)

UK cassette single 
 "I Will Love Again"
 "I Will Love Again" (ballad reprise)

European CD single 
 "I Will Love Again" – 3:47
 "You Are My Heart" – 4:11

European maxi-CD single 
 "I Will Love Again" – 3:47
 "I Will Love Again" (ballad reprise) – 4:54
 "You Are My Heart" – 4:11

Australian CD single 
 "I Will Love Again" (album version) – 3:43
 "I Will Love Again" (Hex Hector 7-inch vocal mix) – 3:30
 "I Will Love Again" (David Morales radio remix) – 3:45
 "I Will Love Again" (Thunderpuss radio mix) – 3:50
 "I Will Love Again" (video) – 3:43

Japanese CD single 
 "I Will Love Again" (album version) – 3:47
 "I Will Love Again" (ballad reprise) – 4:55
 "I Will Love Again" (David Morales club remix) – 8:04

Charts

Weekly charts

Year-end charts

Certifications

Release history

References

1999 songs
2000 singles
Columbia Records singles
Epic Records singles
Lara Fabian songs
Song recordings produced by Brian Rawling
Song recordings produced by Mark Taylor (record producer)
Songs written by Mark Taylor (record producer)
Songs written by Paul Barry (songwriter)